Casuarina Coastal Reserve is a protected area in the northern area of Darwin in the Northern Territory of Australia.

The area includes  of sandy beaches backed by Casuarina trees and sandstone cliffs. The reserve includes areas of mangroves, paperbark forests and monsoon vine thickets.

The Buffalo Creek boat ramp was built in the early 1970s and the reserve area was acquired by the Commonwealth of Australia in 1978. During the 1980s the boat ramp was upgraded and a carpark and toilets were constructed nearby. In 2001 facilities were upgraded and the second management plan was completed.

Fauna found within the reserve include ospreys, sea eagles, cormorants, gulls and a variety of marine life including crocodiles. Mammals found in the area include the northern brushtail possum and the northern brown bandicoot which both thrive in the forests.

See also
Protected areas of the Northern Territory

References

Coastal reserves in the Northern Territory
1978 establishments in Australia